George Dana O'Donnell (May 27, 1929 – December 19, 2012) was a pitcher in Major League Baseball. He played one season with the Pittsburgh Pirates in the 1954 season. Overall, he played professional baseball for thirteen seasons, from 1949 through 1961, mostly in the Minor leagues.

References

External links

Major League Baseball pitchers
Pittsburgh Pirates players
Appleton Papermakers players
Charleston Rebels players
Columbus Jets players
Hollywood Stars players
New Orleans Pelicans (baseball) players
Olean Oilers players
Mayfield Clothiers players
Salt Lake City Bees players
Spokane Indians players
Syracuse Chiefs players
Waco Pirates players
Baseball players from Illinois
People from Winchester, Illinois
Sportspeople from Springfield, Illinois
1929 births
2012 deaths